The Higher Education Authority (HEA) of Zambia was established under the Higher Education Act No. 4 of 2013 in order to provide quality assurance, regulation of private and public higher education institutions and registration of private higher education institutions.

The mandate of the Authority is to coordinate, regulate, supervise and monitor standards of higher education in Zambia.

History
The authority was established in 2015.

Governance
The authority is made up of a board, forming three committees:
 Finance and administration committee
 Registration and accreditation committee
 Standards/quality assurance committee

Registered Private Higher Education Institutions (HEIS) 
 Africa Research University - Lusaka Province
African Christian University - Lusaka Province
African Open University - Copperbelt Province
Ambassador International University - Lusaka Province
Bethel University - Western Province
Blessings University of Excellence - Lusaka Province
Brook Besor University - Lusaka Province
Cavendish University - Lusaka Province
Cavendish University, Longacres Campus - Lusaka Province
Chreso University, Nangwenya Campus - Lusaka Campus
City University of Science and Technology, Provident House campus - Lusaka Province
City University of Science and Technology, Lusaka South Campus - Lusaka Province
Copperstone University - Lusaka Province
DMI-St Eugene University, Woodlands Campus - Lusaka Province
DMI-St Eugene, Chibombo Campus - Central Province
DMI-St Eugene, Chipata Campus - Eastern Province
Eden University - Lusaka Province
Evangelical University - Copperbelt Province
Foundation for Cross Cultural University - Copperbelt Province
Gideon Robert University - Lusaka Province
Greenlight University - Lusaka Province
Harvest University - Lusaka Province
Information and Communication University - Lusaka Province
Justo Mwale University - Lusaka Province
Kenneth Kaunda Metropolitan University - Lusaka Province
Livingstone International University of Tourism Excellence and Business Management (LIUTEBM) - Lusaka Province
Lusaka Apex Medical University, Kasama Road Campus - Lusaka Province
Lusaka Apex Medical University, Charles Lwanga Campus - Lusaka Province
Lusaka Apex Medical University, Mutandwa Campus - Lusaka Province
Lusaka Apex Medical University, Olympia Campus - Lusaka Province
Lusaka Apex Medical University, Foxdale Campus - Lusaka Province
Lusaka Apex Medical University, Tick Campus - Lusaka Province
Management College of Southern Africa (MANCOSA)- Lusaka Province
Mansfield University - Lusaka Province
Mosa University College of Education and Health Sciences - Central Province
Northrise University, Main Campus - Copperbelt Province
Oak University - Lusaka Province
Paglory University - Central Province
Rockview University - Lusaka Province
Rusangu University, Monze Campus - Southern Province
Rusangu University, Lusaka Campus - Lusaka Province
Rusangu University, Copperbelt Campus - Copperbelt Province
South Valley University - Southern Province
Southern University - Southern Province
St. Bonaventure University - Lusaka Province
St. Dominic's Major Seminary - Lusaka Province
Sunningdale University  - Lusaka Province
Supershine University - Lusaka Province
Texila American University - Lusaka Province
The University of Barotseland - Western Province
Trans-Africa Christian University - Copperbelt Province
Trinity University - Lusaka Province
Twin Palm Leadership University - Lusaka Province
UNICAF (Zambia Limited) University - Lusaka Province
United Church of Zambia University - Copperbelt Province
University of Africa - Lusaka Province
University of Edenburg - Copperbelt Province
University of Lusaka - Lusaka Province
Victoria Falls University of Technology - Southern Province
Zambia Catholic University - Copperbelt Province
Zambia Christian University - Southern Province
Zambia Open University - Lusaka Province
Zambia Royal Medical University - Lusaka Province
ZCAS University - Lusaka Province

Public Higher Education Institutions 

 Chalimbana University - Lusaka Province
Copperbelt University - Copperbelt Province
Kwame Nkhrumah University - Central Province
Mukuba University - Copperbelt Province
Mulungushi University - Central Province
Robert Kapasa Makasa University - Muchinga Province
University of Zambia (UNZA) - Lusaka Province

References

Educational organisations based in Zambia
Regulation in Zambia
Higher education authorities